The Queen Victoria (more often referred to as The Queen Vic or The Vic) is the Victorian public house in the BBC soap opera, EastEnders. It has the fictional address of 46 Albert Square, Walford, London E20.

Appearance and development

In the series' backstory, Albert Square was built around 1860 during the reign of Queen Victoria. In February 2020 Sharon Watts (Letitia Dean) revealed that the original landlords of The Queen Victoria were Mr and Mrs Bagstock, and that he’d drowned his wife in the bath. Originally the pub was to be called The Balmoral Arms but after the death of Prince Albert it was renamed as a tribute to the mourning Queen. In reality, Albert Square is based on the real Fassett Square in Hackney, but there is no pub there so The Queen Victoria is based on what was once College Park Tavern on Harrow Road in Harlesden. Initially, the pub's exterior is first seen painted brown. This is later changed to a green and cream colour scheme in late 1990, before Grant Mitchell (Ross Kemp) sets alight to the Queen Victoria in 1992, after which it is painted red. Following another blaze in 2010, the pub is painted red, green and cream. On Boxing Day 2013, the new family to the square, the Carters, took over the Queen Vic and since then it has had a refurbishment and has been painted red once again.

During the first months of the show, The Queen Victoria has a partition wall down the middle of the bar which separates it into two sections. The smaller section, known as the 'snug', houses a dart board and fruit machines, whilst the larger section, known as the saloon bar, is used primarily as the customer seating area. Den Watts (Leslie Grantham) gets permission from the brewery to remove the partition in 1985, and hires Tony Carpenter (Oscar James) to do the job. In 2007 the pub has its first refurbishment in 15 years, and another in late 2010.

In reality the pub exterior shell on the outdoor permanent set was built during 1984 for the new series the following year. The exterior shell was made to look as though it had stood for a hundred years. The internal sets are in a studio separate from the building situated in the Square.

Inside Soap said that the pub was the most "haunted" location in EastEnders, considering the number of characters who have died in or outside the building, including Den, Archie Mitchell (Larry Lamb), Bradley Branning (Charlie Clements), Tiffany Mitchell (Martine McCutcheon) and Tom Clements (Donald Tandy).

2010 fire

In a storyline shown during September 2010, The Queen Victoria was severely damaged by a fire. This allowed for a subtle redesign and upgrade of the set; required when high-definition broadcasting commenced. A separate set was built on the George Lucas sound stage at Elstree Studios to enable the pub interior to be set alight safely.

A team of nearly forty-five crew members were involved in the filming of the fire including makeup, stunt team, fire safety officers, cameras, lighting, sound and the costume department. The exterior scenes took five half days to shoot (as it could only be shot at night) and were shot at the BBC studios in Borehamwood. The interior scenes were shot a week after and took three days to film.

Safety necessitated having the set re-created at the Elstree Film Studios stage facility that is designed and equipped to film fire scenes. EastEnders Production Manager Rona McKendrick says "Potentially hazardous scenes like this always require specialist knowledge and we rely on their experience and advice to ensure that everything is achieved as safely as possible. We had a Stunt Team comprising Lee Sheward, our Stunt Co-ordinator and his team of Stunt Doubles. A Visual FX team designed and executed all the fire sequences and we had specialist Fire Officers providing out of vision fire cover / safety."

Of the fire itself, McKendrick said "Everyone was very sad to see The Vic taken out of Stage One and moved to Elstree Film Studios for the burn, I've known the set for 18 years and to see the enormous space it left was as if a piece of history had been removed".

Storylines

In the EastEnders series spin-off CivvyStreet (1988) life in Albert Square is featured between 1939 and 1945, and The Queen Victoria (The Queen Vic) freehold is owned by the brewery, Luxford & Copley. Ray and Lil Sewell (Robert Putt and Frances Cuka) are the landlords. When the series begins, the brewery remain owners and Den (Leslie Grantham) and Angie Watts (Anita Dobson) have been landlords for ten years; previous landlords alluded to in conversation include Gus and Flo Leonard and Alf and Polly Barrett. In 2020, the first landlords of the pub are mentioned as being Mr and Mrs Bagstock, Mrs Bagstock having been drowned by her husband in the bath.

Angie is served with divorce papers by Den on Christmas Day 1986 and two years later he passes control to Frank (Mike Reid) and Pat Butcher (Pam St. Clement). In 1990, Frank and Pat hand over the pub to Eddie Royle. Eddie is murdered by Nick Cotton (John Altman) the following year, and the daughter of Den and Angie, Sharon Watts (Letitia Dean), becomes the first licensee when she buys the freehold of The Queen Vic with the assistance of her husband Grant Mitchell (Ross Kemp) and his brother Phil (Steve McFadden); the three live there. Grant sets fire to the pub in 1992 in an insurance scam and it is refurbished. Grant and Sharon divorce in 1995 after her affair with Phil was exposed and their share of The Queen Vic is sold to Grant and Phil's mother, Peggy (Barbara Windsor). Peggy marries Frank in 1999 and he again becomes a landlord. When Grant leaves Walford, Peggy's alcoholic son Phil sells his share of the pub to Dan Sullivan (Craig Fairbrass) for a mere £5 to spite his domineering mother. However, he subsequently buys back his share and evicts Dan from The Queen Vic. After Frank disappears and leaves her penniless, Peggy is forced to sell the pub in early 2001. The new buyer is revealed to be Sharon, in partnership with Steve Owen (Martin Kemp). Steve has to sell his share to raise ransom money for his wife Mel (Tamzin Outhwaite) and Phil buys back part of The Queen Vic. In 2002, Sharon also sells up to Phil and the pub returns to the control of the Mitchells. Peggy appoints Alfie Moon as manager later that year.

In 2004, Den tricks his way back into ownership of The Queen Vic, and within a few months he is killed by his second wife, Chrissie (Tracy-Ann Oberman), who buries his body in the cellar of pub. Chrissie forges his signature on a deed of transfer and tells the customers that he has left Walford, signing The Queen Vic over to her. Sam Mitchell (Kim Medcalf) digs up Den's body and Chrissie, in a plan to escape, sells the pub to Ian Beale (Adam Woodyatt) and is subsequently arrested for murder. Her confessing to forging his signature nullifies the sale to Ian and ownership reverts to Sharon, Den's heir. Sharon returns The Queen Vic to Peggy and Phil. When Sam (now played by Danniella Westbrook) breaks bail in 2009, the family goes into debt. Phil secures The Queen Vic against a loan from Ian, who is forced to sell it to Peggy's ex-husband Archie (Larry Lamb). The Mitchells initially continue running the pub but Peggy relents and hands over control to Archie and his fiancée Janine Butcher (Charlie Brooks) after her step daughter Ronnie Mitchell (Samantha Womack) suffers a miscarriage during a confrontation with her father Archie. After Archie is murdered on Christmas Day, his daughter Roxy (Rita Simons) inherits The Queen Vic. When Roxy tries to sell it on, Peggy objects, and Roxy signs over the pub to her. Later in 2010, Phil develops a drug addiction and is locked in a room in the pub by Peggy. After he escapes, he argues with his mother and sets fire to the pub as an act of revenge. The fire traps him and Stacey Branning (Lacey Turner) along with her baby Lily, but they all manage to escape.

Again, fire destroys The Queen Vic and Peggy transfers ownership to Phil before she leaves Walford. Phil renovates the pub and rents it to Alfie Moon and his wife Kat (Jessie Wallace). Kat is away temporarily in 2012 when Roxy again is landlady but upon Kat's return, The Queen Vic is forced to close down due to an outbreak of bed bugs, the source of which was thought to be Shirley Carter (Linda Henry), who has been staying. Instead, it was found that the source was the flat where Kat was meeting her lover Derek Branning (Jamie Foreman). The Queen Vic returns to Phil when Kat and Alfie fail to pay rent and Roxy is again made manager. However, Phil has a change of mind about Kat and Alfie when he finds out from Kat about her affair and subsequent attempt to save her marriage, all the while leaving Roxy as manager. During Christmas 2012, Alfie finds out about the affair, they separate and Roxy and Amy move back to The Queen Vic. Roxy replaces Kat as the joint licensee of the pub with Alfie, but leaves after Alfie reunites with Kat on the day of his and Roxy's wedding. As an act of revenge against the Moons, Phil decides to sell the pub and Alfie and Kat are forced to move out. Janine initially tries to buy the pub, but is arrested for murder before paying Phil. Mick Carter (Danny Dyer) buys The Queen Victoria on Christmas Day, 2013, and the following day moves into the pub with his wife Linda Carter (Kellie Bright) and son Johnny Carter (Sam Strike). Phil is surprised to discover that Mick is Shirley's brother. When Shirley persuades their estranged father into giving them £10,000 to repair the rising damp in the cellar, Mick and Linda give Shirley a 10% stake in the pub.

In 2016, Mick and Linda's son, Lee Carter (Danny-Boy Hatchard) gets into debt, and Mick pays it off by taking out loans. The family struggle to pay for court fines after Babe Smith (Annette Badland) sells alcohol outside of licensing hours, repairs to a leaking roof, for Sylvie Carter's (Linda Marlowe) funeral, and vets bills for their dog, Lady Di (Hot Lips). While Linda and Mick are away, Linda sends Woody Woodward (Lee Ryan) to look after the pub as a manager. Max Branning (Jake Wood) hears of the Carters' financial problems and suggests to Shirley that they sell the freehold of the pub. Shirley convinces Linda but they do not tell Mick, and Shirley forges his signature. The new freeholders, Grafton Hill, send Fi Browning (Lisa Faulkner), a business consultant, to look at ways to maximise profit at the pub, and she concludes that two members of staff need to be made redundant, but insists that the freeholders want Woody to stay, so Sharon, and barmaid Tracey (Jane Slaughter) are made redundant. It then emerges that the company Max works for, Weyland & Co, are involved and they have a mole in the pub, as the company is planning to redevelop the local area and The Queen Vic is their first target. It is soon revealed that Fi is the mole, and Grafton Hill makes them pay for further repairs. Fi tricks the Carters into thinking the debt is less, so when they fail to pay, they are given a month to leave and it is revealed that Fi's father, James Willmott-Brown (William Boyde) is the owner. However, after Fi realises that James is a rapist, who had raped Kathy back in 1988 and he is arrested for fraud, she offers the Carters the chance to buy the Vic back, which they are eventually able to do.

In 2020, after Linda struggles with alcoholism, Mick decides to sell the pub in order to help Linda recover. Phil tries to buy the pub in order to repair his marriage to Sharon, but after he kicks her out, Linda refuses to sell to Phil. The pub is therefore sold to Ian, who installs Sharon as the landlady and she moves in with her son, Albie Watts. In 2021, after Ian disappears from Walford, he transfers ownership over to Sharon. After being blackmailed by Max, Phil convinces Sharon to sell the Vic back to Mick and Linda.

In 2022 on Christmas Day, Mick vanishes at sea, and is presumed dead, leaving Linda as the sole owner of the Vic.

Employees

Current staff

Previous staff

Key events in The Queen Victoria

1980s
 1986: Pat Wicks (Pam St Clement) tells her former husband Pete Beale (Peter Dean) that he is not the father of her son Simon (Nick Berry).
 1986: Den Watts (Leslie Grantham) serves his wife Angie (Anita Dobson) with divorce papers, on Christmas Day.
 1988: Potman Tom Clements (Donald Tandy) dies in the gentlemen's toilets, of a heart attack.

1990s
 1992: Grant Mitchell (Ross Kemp) sets fire to the pub to claim money on the insurance, with his wife, Sharon (Letitia Dean), plus Roly the Poodle trapped inside.
 1994: Michelle Fowler (Susan Tully) is shot by Dougie Briggs (Max Gold).
 1994: "Sharongate": Sharon Mitchell (Letitia Dean) is caught out when Grant Mitchell (Ross Kemp) plays in the bar a taped confession of her two-year affair with Phil Mitchell (Steve McFadden) during Phil and Kathy Beale's (Gillian Taylforth) engagement party.
 1996: Mark Fowler (Todd Carty) publicly declares he is HIV positive.
 1998: Tiffany Mitchell (Martine McCutcheon) discovers her husband Grant's (Ross Kemp) affair with her mother Louise Raymond (Carol Harrison) whilst listening to the baby monitor. This results in not only her permanently ending her relationship with Grant, but her death days later after being run over accidentally by Frank Butcher (Mike Reid).
 1998: During an argument with Grant Mitchell (Ross Kemp) whilst confronting him about the affair, Tiffany Mitchell (Martine McCutcheon) she attempts to leave but falls down the stairs and falsely accuses Grant of pushing her.
 1998: Bianca Butcher (Patsy Palmer) gives birth to her son Liam Butcher in the pub on Christmas Day 1998, assisted by Grant Mitchell (Ross Kemp).
 1999: Bianca Butcher (Patsy Palmer) and Dan Sullivan's (Craig Fairbrass) affair is blurted out by Carol Jackson (Lindsey Coulson) which results in Carol having an abortion and Bianca's departure.

2000s
 2000: Pat Evans (Pam St Clement) and Frank Butcher (Mike Reid) are humiliated by Peggy Mitchell (Barbara Windsor) when she exposes their affair by reading out a goodbye letter from Frank.
 2001: Steve Owen (Martin Kemp) pays Jamie Mitchell (Jack Ryder) to smash the windows in order to play mind games with Phil Mitchell (Steve McFadden).
 2002: A fight breaks out between the Slaters and the Truemans, resulting in Paul Trueman (Gary Beadle) being arrested for assault.
 2003: Little Mo Mitchell (Kacey Ainsworth) is raped – and impregnated – by Graham Foster (Alex McSweeney).
 2003: Kat Slater (Jessie Wallace) and Alfie Moon (Shane Richie) marry on Christmas Day.
 2004: Den Watts (Leslie Grantham) evicts Alfie Moon (Shane Richie) and his family on Christmas Eve after buying the Vic.
 2004: The affair between Sharon Watts (Letitia Dean) and Dennis Rickman (Nigel Harman) is revealed to their family, including Dennis’ girlfriend Zoe Slater (Michelle Ryan).
 2005: Den Watts (Leslie Grantham) is murdered by his second wife Chrissie Watts (Tracy-Ann Oberman) with Pauline Fowler's (Wendy Richard) dog-shaped doorstop; she buries his body under concrete in the cellar of the pub.
 2005: Den Watts' (Leslie Grantham) corpse is uncovered by Sam Mitchell (Kim Medcalf) on the wedding day of Sharon Watts (Letitia Dean) and Dennis Rickman (Nigel Harman).
 2007: The pub is raided by Terry Bates (Nicholas Bell) and his gang who are looking for Jase Dyer (Stephen Lord); the interior is destroyed.
 2007: Stacey Slater (Lacey Turner) slaps and attacks Tanya Branning (Jo Joyner) resulting in the two women brawling on Peggy's birthday.
 2008: On Christmas Day, Sean Slater (Robert Kazinsky) discovers that he is not the real father of Amy Mitchell.
 2009: At the wedding reception of Peggy (Barbara Windsor) and Archie Mitchell (Larry Lamb), Ronnie Mitchell (Samantha Womack) discovers that Danielle Jones (Lauren Crace) is her daughter.
 2009: Archie Mitchell (Larry Lamb) is murdered (see Who Killed Archie?) on Christmas Day when Stacey Slater (Lacey Turner) pushes the bust of Queen Victoria onto his head.

2010s
 2010: While resisting arrest for Archie Mitchell's (Larry Lamb) murder, Bradley Branning (Charlie Clements) falls to his death from the pub roof.
 2010: The pub is raided by Billie Jackson (Devon Anderson) and his gang for money.
 2010: Phil Mitchell (Steve McFadden) starts a fire that destroys the entire building to hurt his mother, Peggy Mitchell (Barbara Windsor).
 2010: On Christmas Eve, Janine Malloy (Charlie Brooks) reveals that Stacey Branning (Lacey Turner) murdered Archie Mitchell (Larry Lamb).
 2010: Mo Harris (Laila Morse) delivers Kat Moon's (Jessie Wallace) baby Tommy in the barrel store on 30 December.
 2011: On New Year's Day, Ronnie Branning (Samantha Womack) swaps her deceased baby, James, with Kat Moon's (Jessie Wallace) son, Tommy.
 2013: Kat Moon (Jessie Wallace) slaps Roxy Mitchell (Rita Simons) twice resulting in the two having a catfight in the pub, with Alfie Moon (Shane Richie) and Michael Moon (Steve John Shepherd) having to break it up.
 2014: Stan Carter (Timothy West) accidentally leaves a lit cigarette near the curtains causing a small fire, which is then extinguished by firemen.
 2014: Dean Wicks (Matt Di Angelo) rapes Linda Carter (Kellie Bright) on the kitchen table.
 2014: After learning that Linda Carter (Kellie Bright) was raped by Dean Wicks (Matt Di Angelo), Mick Carter (Danny Dyer) destroys the interior of the pub.
 2015: Kim Fox-Hubbard (Tameka Empson) gives birth to her baby girl, Pearl, in the toilets.
 2015: Linda Carter (Kellie Bright) falls down the stairs whilst pregnant.
 2016: Nancy Carter (Maddy Hill) and Lee Carter (Danny-Boy Hatchard) fight, causing Ollie Carter to hit his head after his highchair is knocked over. Ollie later stops breathing and suffers a seizure.
 2016: During Stacey (Lacey Turner) and Martin Fowler's (James Bye) wedding reception, Bobby Beale (Eliot Carrington) confesses that he murdered (see Who Killed Lucy Beale?) his half-sister, Lucy Beale (Hetti Bywater).
 2016: Abi Branning (Lorna Fitzgerald) locks Babe Smith (Annette Badland) in the walk-in freezer.
 2016: Three armed robbers raid the pub on orders from Lee Carter (Danny-Boy Hatchard); his brother Johnny Carter (Ted Reilly) is injured.
 2017: Sylvie Carter (Linda Marlowe) dies by electrocuting herself in the bath.
 2017: While attempting to prevent their father, Max Branning (Jake Wood), from committing suicide, Lauren Branning (Jacqueline Jossa) and Abi Branning (Lorna Fitzgerald) fall from the roof of the pub in the same place as their half-brother, Bradley Branning (Charlie Clements). Lauren survives the fall, while Abi later dies of her injuries in hospital.
 2018: A brawl breaks out in the pub after Kat Slater (Jessie Wallace) pushes Karen Taylor (Lorraine Stanley) over a table after the pair argue as it is revealed that Mo Harris (Laila Morse) tried to con people out of money by faking the death of Kat Moon (Jessie Wallace). A bar stool is thrown out of one of the windows.
 2018: Stuart Highway (Ricky Champ) is shot by an unknown assailant.
 2018: After he attempts to rape Linda Carter (Kellie Bright), Stuart Highway (Ricky Champ), unaware that he is being recorded, confesses to Linda that he shot himself.
 2019: Mel Owen (Tamzin Outhwaite) drunkenly rages at the residents over their opinions about the sentencing of her son, Hunter Owen (Charlie Winter).
 2019: Linda Carter (Kellie Bright), Mick Carter (Danny Dyer), Mel Owen (Tamzin Outhwaite) and Jack Branning (Scott Maslen) are taken hostage by Hunter Owen (Charlie Winter). Ben Mitchell (Max Bowden) and Keanu Taylor (Danny Walters) are shot and Hunter is killed by a police marksman.

2020s
 2020: Believing that he has killed Keanu Taylor (Danny Walters), Karen Taylor (Lorraine Stanley) attacks Phil Mitchell (Steve McFadden).
 2020: While drunk, Linda Carter (Kellie Bright) tells Mick Carter (Danny Dyer) that she wants to divorce him.
 2020: After Linda Carter (Kellie Bright) insults Mick, she and Shirley Carter (Linda Henry) have a fight.
 2020: Ian Beale (Adam Woodyatt) is attacked by Phil Mitchell (Steve McFadden)..
 2020: After learning that Kathy Beale (Gillian Taylforth) provided Ben Mitchell (Max Bowden) with a false alibi, Ian Beale (Adam Woodyatt) smashes up the bar area.
 2021: Sharon Beale (Letitia Dean) attempts to kill Ian Beale (Adam Woodyatt) by poisoning him.
 2022: After Mick Carter (Danny Dyer) disappears, Shirley Carter (Linda Henry) smashes up the bar.

See also
 List of fictional pubs

References

External links
 The Queen Victoria BBC EastEnders profile via The Internet Archive

EastEnders locations
Fictional drinking establishments
Fictional elements introduced in 1985